On November 30, 2021, a mass shooting occurred at Oxford High School in the Detroit exurb of Oxford Township, Michigan, United States. 15-year old Ethan Crumbley, armed with a 9mm semi-automatic handgun, murdered four students and injured seven people, including a teacher. Authorities arrested and charged Crumbley as an adult for 24 crimes, including murder and terrorism. Crumbley pleaded guilty to all of the charges in October 2022.

Crumbley's parents, Jennifer and James Crumbley, were charged on December 3 with involuntary manslaughter for failing to secure the handgun used in the shooting. After failing to appear for their arraignment, the parents were the subjects of a manhunt by the U.S. Marshals; they were caught and arrested in Detroit on December 4. Lawsuits were filed against the school district, Oxford Community Schools, starting on December 9; they allege negligence by school officials towards warning signs exhibited by Crumbley leading up to the shooting.

Background
Oxford High School used the active shooter drill known as ALICE (Alert, Lockdown, Inform, Counter, and Evacuate), which uses proactive strategies to evade a gunman, such as using noise as a distraction and creating distance. The teachers were also trained to use a barrier at the base of the door called Nightlock, which was installed on every door of the school in 2017 per Michigan law.

According to students and parents, rumors regarding threats of a mass shooting occurring at the school were circulating before the incident occurred, prompting some students to stay home on the day of the shooting. Earlier that month, in response to an act of vandalism that included a severed deer head being thrown off the school roof and into the courtyard, school administrators published a note to parents, saying they had been investigating the rumors but found no threat. Oakland County Sheriff Michael Bouchard said his office was not aware of any credible threats prior to the shooting.

Shooting
Surveillance footage reportedly showed suspect Ethan Crumbley entering a bathroom with a backpack and then exiting it about a minute later without the backpack but with a semiautomatic handgun. Immediately afterwards, prosecutors and school officials said Crumbley started firing in the hallway at students during passing time, when hundreds of students were transitioning from one class to another. When they started fleeing, he "methodically and deliberately" walked down the hallway and shot into classrooms and at students who were unable to escape until he went to another bathroom. Due to the quick response by students and staff to the gunshots, Crumbley was unable to enter any of the classrooms.

According to students, a voice over the intercom alerted them to an active shooter, and their teachers started locking and barricading doors and covering windows, convincing them it was not a drill. Others recounted hearing some loud banging noises, before realizing the noises were gunshots and quickly locking the door. One student who hid in a bathroom stall recalled hearing the sound of a gun cocking outside the bathroom. Once the school was secured, he opened the bathroom door to find several bodies lying on the floor.

At 12:51 p.m., police began receiving the first of around one hundred 9-1-1 calls about the shooting and responded to the school. Within two to three minutes of the arrival of first responders, Crumbley was arrested unharmed by a deputy assigned as a school resource officer and a second deputy who had responded to the scene. He allegedly still had seven rounds of ammunition loaded into his gun and two 15-round magazines when he was stopped by the deputies. At a news conference, Oakland County Undersheriff Michael McCabe said the gunman gave up without any problems. The entire shooting lasted about five minutes and occurred in the southern end of the school building.

After the shooting occurred, the school went into lockdown. Some students were evacuated to a nearby Meijer store, and one woman helped children to shelter in her house. Authorities conducted three sweeps of the school in search of victims and evidence. At least one student posted a video to social media of people hiding in a classroom during the lockdown, where a person out in the hallway claimed to be law enforcement. Those in the classroom mistakenly believed they were speaking to the gunman, and they subsequently fled the classroom via the windows and were led to safety by a deputy. Due to confusion from the video, Sheriff Bouchard clarified during a press conference that the gunman had never knocked on a door based on surveillance footage and the person was likely a detective trying to calm the students.

Victims
Three students – Madisyn Baldwin, age 17; Tate Myre, age 16; and Hana St. Juliana, age 14 – were killed at the scene, and eight other people were injured, including a teacher. Myre was reportedly shot while attempting to stop the gunman; he died in a police vehicle en route to the hospital. On December 1, a fourth student, 17-year-old Justin Shilling, died in the hospital from his injuries. At the time, this incident was the deadliest school shooting in the United States since the 2018 Santa Fe High School shooting.

, three of the injured were in critical condition, with one of them on a ventilator; one was in serious condition; three were in stable condition; and the injured teacher was discharged after being treated for a graze wound to the shoulder. The last of the injured was discharged on January 17, 2022, more than a month after the shooting.

Investigation
The school was processed by authorities, with video footage from security cameras in the school building being the investigators' primary focus. Officials told reporters that the cameras showed some of the actual shooting, and that Crumbley had a clear intent to kill other students, saying he fired through barricaded doors and aimed for the heads and chests of victims at close range.

A search warrant was also executed at Crumbley's home, where a cell phone, a journal, several long guns, and other items were seized as part of the investigation around the shooting and Crumbley's prior social media posts. The cell phone contained two videos of Crumbley, both of which were filmed the night before the shooting, and in which he purportedly talked about shooting and killing students at the school the next day. The journal also reportedly detailed "his desire to shoot up the school," and was quoted as including: "Hopefully my shooting will cause Biden to get impeached." According to Sheriff Bouchard, as reported on December 4, investigators had spoken with Crumbley's parents during the search of their home, but not afterward.

School response
Following public scrutiny of the school's handling of reports about Crumbley's behavior, the superintendent of Oxford Community Schools, the school district that includes Oxford High School, announced that a third-party investigation of the incident would be conducted. He also said he would recommend a review of the district's "entire system" to school board members. The office of Michigan Attorney General Dana Nessel offered to conduct the investigation, but the district declined the offer. Instead, the district stated that it would use an "outside firm" for the investigation. Later, during an interview with WXYZ-TV, Nessel criticized the district's decision to hire a third party to conduct an investigation, saying she did not believe it was appropriate. She also expressed her doubts that the results of the investigation would be made public.

On December 6, prosecutor Karen McDonald said Oxford High School officials had legal grounds to search Crumbley's backpack and locker when concerns were raised about his behavior on the day of the shooting, but they never did so, for reasons which were not made clear. She also said that charges against school officials were not being ruled out. On December 8, Nessel announced her office's intent to review the actions taken by the school leading up to the shooting, despite the district turning down her offer to do so, saying, "I really do think it's incumbent upon the Michigan Department of Attorney General and the top law enforcement official in the state to conduct a further review."

Perpetrator
The shooter was identified as 15-year-old sophomore student Ethan Crumbley (born April 28, 2006). He was in class on the day of the shooting. Crumbley was placed under suicide watch after being taken to the county's juvenile detention facility. He initially maintained his right to silence.

While he was at an early age, Crumbley's parents both worked in business development and marketing before the family moved to Issaquah, Washington, a few years later. While living in Issaquah, Crumbley developed an immediate interest in horror and violence at a young age. At the time, he played first person shooter games such as the Call of Duty franchise and also watched horror movies. 

Shortly after the family moved to Michigan a few years later, a former neighbor told the Detroit Free Press that, in 2014 and 2015, Crumbley's parents Jennifer and James often left their son home alone and without a phone while frequenting bars in downtown Lake Orion. The neighbor became so concerned that she filed an anonymous complaint via phone to the state's child protective services agency, but she did not know if any action was taken. According to prosecutors, Crumbley's only friend moved away at the end of October 2021, and the family dog died, causing him to become depressed. As early as March 2021, he started sending his mother "disturbing texts about his state of mind", which included claims about "demons" and "ghosts" inside the home. He also reportedly videotaped himself torturing animals, made Molotov cocktails, and drew a sketch of himself committing a school shooting, which he also joked about with a friend via text message. At one point, Crumbley allegedly kept a baby bird's head in a jar, which he later placed in a school bathroom. His parents allegedly never sought therapy for him after any of those incidents.

A 9mm SIG Sauer SP 2022 semi-automatic handgun and at least two 15-round magazines were recovered from Crumbley at the time of his arrest, while a third magazine was found at the school. Bouchard said James Crumbley had purchased the gun under his own name from a local gun shop on Black Friday, four days prior to the shooting. McDonald later said that Ethan Crumbley was with his father at the time of the purchase and that he posted about it on social media later that day. McDonald also said that Jennifer Crumbley referred to the gun as Ethan's "new Christmas present" in a social media post. Based on recovered shell casings found in the school, authorities believe at least 30 shots were fired. It was unclear how the gunman gained possession of the gun or how it was brought by him into the school building. In Michigan, minors cannot legally possess guns, other than within limited circumstances, such as when hunting with an adult.

Behavior prior to the shooting
Police said there was no indication that Crumbley had faced any disciplinary issues prior to the shooting. Still, Crumbley was reported to have met with school officials the day prior to the shooting, and once again early on the day of the shooting, to discuss his behavior. Prosecutor Karen McDonald later provided a timeline regarding the meetings. The first meeting occurred after a teacher spotted Crumbley using his phone to search for ammunition and reported him. During the discussion, Crumbley told them that he and his mother Jennifer had recently traveled to a shooting range and that "shooting sports are a family hobby." School officials left a voicemail and email for Jennifer Crumbley; she did not respond, but she later texted her son, saying, "LOL I'm not mad at you. You have to learn not to get caught." The second meeting occurred after another teacher found a violent drawing on Crumbley's desk, described by McDonald in a press conference as:

The teacher took a photo of the drawing, which was on a math worksheet, and reported Crumbley. He was taken to a guidance counselor's office, where school staff phoned Crumbley's parents, requesting that they come to the school. According to the superintendent of Oxford Community Schools, while waiting for his parents to arrive, school counselors did not observe any behavior from Crumbley that indicated to them that he might harm others. Upon their arrival, Crumbley's parents were shown the drawing – which Crumbley had scribbled over by that point in an attempt to conceal its contents – and instructed to seek counseling for their son within 48 hours; otherwise, the school would call child protective services. They "resisted the idea" of Crumbley leaving to go home at the time, and did not inform school officials that they had recently purchased a gun for him. He was returned to class that same morning, as he had no prior disciplinary issues. According to McDonald, at the time of that meeting, Crumbley had already placed the weapon he was to use in the shooting somewhere on the school grounds.

Following the second meeting, Crumbley allegedly committed the shooting at 12:50 p.m. Prosecutors further alleged that at 1:22 – seven minutes after the first news reports came in of a shooting at the school – Jennifer Crumbley texted her son, saying, "Ethan, don't do it." At 1:37, James Crumbley called 9-1-1 to report a SIG Sauer SP 2022 handgun as missing, and also said Ethan "could be the gunman at Oxford High".

According to the Oxford Community Schools superintendent on December 2, no discipline had been warranted at the time of the meetings with Crumbley and his parents. Sheriff Bouchard said concerns about Crumbley's troubling behavior had never been shared with his office.

Legal proceedings

Against Ethan Crumbley

Crumbley was arraigned by a magistrate on homicide and attempted homicide charges shortly after he was arrested, to allow for continued custody, but he was not immediately charged as an adult. On December 1, he was charged with terrorism causing death, first-degree murder, assault with intent to murder, and possession of a firearm during the commission of a felony, with the possibility of more charges being added as the investigation continued. According to the Associated Press, this appeared to be the first time in U.S. history where a terrorism charge was filed in relation to a gunfire incident on school grounds. The terrorism charge is provided under Michigan law for "an act that is intended to intimidate or coerce a civilian population", in this case, the Oxford High School community.

Crumbley was charged as an adult, and the judge, Nancy T. Carniak, entered a plea of not guilty on his behalf. He was ordered to be held without bond and relocated to the Oakland County Jail, and Carniak scheduled a probable cause conference for December 13 and a preliminary examination for December 20. Crumbley was appointed an attorney by the court after his parents hired lawyers for themselves, but did not do so for their son.

At Crumbley's probable cause conference on December 13, Carniak postponed the upcoming preliminary examination to January 7, 2022, to allow prosecutors to review evidence. Crumbley's appointed guardian ad litem asked that he be moved back to the juvenile detention center, as Crumbley could "hear other adults, which violates the [Michigan] statute for minors being held in adult facilities"; the request was denied by Carniak. Assistant prosecutor Marc Keast said he would contact Oakland County Jail regarding Crumbley's proximity to adults. On January 7, 2022, Crumbley waived the probable cause hearing and was bound over for trial.

On January 12, 2022, a plea of not guilty was entered on Crumbley's behalf during his arraignment. On January 26, 2022, Crumbley announced he would plead insanity via a court filing made by his lawyers. He also requested an evaluation of his criminal responsibility, which is standard procedure; Crumbley was to be evaluated by a doctor from the Center for Forensic Psychiatry.

On October 24, 2022, Crumbley pleaded guilty to all of the charges and withdrew his intent to pursue an insanity defense. He also admitted during questioning on that day that his own money was used to purchase the weapon used and claimed that the gun was not locked away the day of the shooting.

Against Crumbley's parents

Announcement of charges
After announcing the charges against Ethan Crumbley, prosecutor Karen McDonald told reporters that her office was also considering criminal charges against Crumbley's parents, Jennifer and James, in connection to the shooting. She said responsible gun ownership was crucial to stop tragedies and those who are irresponsible with their firearms should be held accountable. On December 3, McDonald held a press conference in which she announced that both parents were being charged with four counts of involuntary manslaughter for their failure to secure the gun Crumbley used in the shooting. It is a rare instance of parents being charged in relation to a school shooting.

Search on December 3–4
After charges were announced against Crumbley's parents Jennifer and James, an alert was issued hours later by state authorities, as the Crumbleys had left the Oxford Township area. Both were supposed to appear with their attorney to turn themselves in but had failed to do so. The Oakland County Sheriff's Office said the Federal Bureau of Investigation (FBI), the U.S. Marshals Service, and the Oakland County Fugitive Apprehension Team were searching for the parents; the FBI said they were not involved at the time.

Shortly after, the Crumbleys' attorneys told the Detroit Free Press that their clients did not flee but rather left town for their own safety and would return to be arraigned. However, both parents missed their 4:00 p.m. arraignment and remained at large. Undersheriff McCabe told CNN that the attorneys had not talked with the parents, after attempting to reach them by phone and text without success. CNN reported that Jennifer and James had withdrawn $4,000 from an ATM in Rochester Hills on December 3, and that they had turned off their cell phones. Late on December 3, the U.S. Marshals released wanted posters for Jennifer and James and also announced rewards of up to $10,000 for information leading to their arrests.

The man also said he saw Jennifer Crumbley, who fled upon being spotted. Police responded to the scene about twenty minutes later and established a perimeter in the area. At around 2:00 a.m. on December 4, police took the couple into custody after finding them in a first-floor room at a nearby commercial building. In a press conference on December 4, the Oakland County Sheriff reported that a person had assisted the parents in entering the building, that additional charges may be filed against them in relation to their fleeing, and that there would also be charges brought against the individual who had helped them. He also said that the Crumbleys were unarmed and very distressed during the arrests, and that there was no indication they had planned to surrender.

The person believed to have assisted the Crumbleys identified himself, through his attorney, as an Oakland County resident who operated a business inside the building. He claimed to not have been aware that the couple was wanted by authorities at the time he allowed them to stay in his workspace. However, he declined to elaborate on the nature of his association with them. He was questioned by authorities, who described him as being cooperative. Police conducted a search on his home in Troy and seized several digital devices.

Pre-trial proceedings
Jennifer and James Crumbley were arraigned on the morning of December 4, where they pleaded not guilty to the charges, and a bail of $500,000 each was set for them. Federal prosecutors began investigating whether federal laws were violated when James Crumbley purchased a handgun for his son. The Crumbleys were held at Oakland County Jail, where their son was also being confined. As a result, all three were put in isolation, monitored under suicide watch, and not allowed to interact for an indefinite amount of time.

During the Crumbleys' probable cause conference on December 14, a judge postponed their preliminary examination to February 8, 2022, while setting a bond hearing for January 7 of that year. During the bond hearing, the judge sided with the prosecutors and declined to lower the Crumbleys' bond, saying they were a flight risk and the charges were too serious to warrant a lowering.

Against the school district
On December 9, multiple survivors of the shooting filed two $100 million lawsuits against Oxford Community Schools and its employees. At least one lawsuit alleges that school officials failed to stop the shooting and ignored several warning signs, such as threats posted to social media that had been brought to the school's attention. On December 10, a lawyer representing two of the survivors requested a judge to order school officials to restore and preserve social media pages and other evidence that she claimed was willfully destroyed by the district following the shooting; the judge granted the request.

Oxford Community Schools filed a motion to dismiss the original $100 million lawsuit on December 14, claiming that the survivors' attorney filed it without conducting due diligence required by the rules of professional responsibility and that it was done in an effort to "be on the news". The complaint filed by the district's legal representatives claimed that a one-time dean of students had been included as a defendant; due to the survivors' attorney not removing him, the man had received death threats and suffered from significant emotional stress. The complaint argued that the man should be removed from the suit and that the survivors' attorney be given significant sanctions.

On January 8, 2022, survivors of the shooting filed an updated $100 million lawsuit that added eleven new counts against the named school officials. The updated lawsuit included the principal and other administrators, accusing them of "gross negligence" and alleging that their actions "caused serious and permanent physical and emotional trauma." According to the lawsuit, school officials were aware of disturbing posts made by Crumbley on social media, as well as his tendencies toward animal cruelty, but they still allowed him to continue attending the school and directed teachers and counselors to discourage reports of Crumbley's behavior.

On January 19, 2022, the superintendent of Oxford Community Schools issued a statement disputing the accusations made against the district in the lawsuits. He said that school officials did not discover, or were not informed about ammunition being displayed to others by Crumbley; that they were not aware of Crumbley's social media presence; that all tips made to school authorities through the "OK2SAY" tip line during November 2021 had been forwarded to and investigated by law enforcement; and that a different student, not Crumbley, was responsible for leaving a jar with a baby bird's head inside a school bathroom. He also said that Crumbley had met with a counselor and the dean of students prior to the shooting, but not with other school administrators or a "restorative practices coordinator". Additionally, the superintendent claimed that the Oxford High School principal and assistant principals ran towards the sound of gunfire to administer aid to the injured and look for the gunman. On January 24, 2022, the district asked a federal judge to suspend the lawsuit until the criminal trials of Crumbley and his parents were concluded, saying the lawsuit could interfere with the prosecution of the Crumbleys.

Aftermath
Many students were traumatized and distressed by the shooting, and they were affected by the loss of their classmates or had seen bodies on the ground. The Michigan Department of Health and Human Services supplied help and support to the students and their families. More than $3.2 million in resources had been approved by the Oakland County Board of Commissioners in response to the shooting since November 30.

Oxford Community Schools closed down its schools for the rest of the week. The district's reopening plan included a "soft opening" that included a law enforcement presence and trained clinicians being on standby for support. Oxford High School remained closed until January 24, 2022; prior to that, students had been attending classes in other buildings. Prior to January 2022, the district's superintendent announced that all middle and high school students would be required to wear clear backpacks, while all elementary school students were required to keep their backpacks in lockers or cubbies all day.

Memorials and fundraisers
Three prayer services were held on the night of November 30, attended by hundreds. A memorial was created outside the school with stuffed animals and flowers left behind. A candlelight vigil was held at Michigan State University on December 7 to honor the victims of the shooting.

An online petition was started to rename the school's stadium after Tate Myre, one of the victims killed in the shooting. A memorial patch to commemorate the victims and the shooting was created for the Michigan Wolverines football team that was first worn on December 4, during the Big Ten Championship Game. The Detroit Lions and Minnesota Vikings also created T-shirts and hats and wore a helmet patch to commemorate the victims for their Week 13 game on December 5, while player Jalen Elliott wore an altered version of his No. 42 jersey, which bore Myre's name. Myre was also given an honorary five-star rating by sports recruitment site 247Sports.com. He also received an honorary offer from Michigan State University.

A GoFundMe was created by a family member of victim Madisyn Baldwin to help pay for funeral costs. Baldwin's family created a hashtag with her name to identify acts of kindness and support as a way to honor her.

Additional fundraisers for the victims and their families were seen on online crowdfunding pages, by local businesses, and by selling items such as T-shirts, to help cover medical, funeral, and other costs. Others used the phrase OxfordStrong to sell fundraising items or as a hashtag on social media. The phrase was also used to identify a drop box location set-up by the township for cards and letters of support.

The organization March for Our Lives held an event in Oxford on December 12 and shared experiences with the students of Oxford High.

Copycat threats and arrests
Copycat threats against numerous Metro Detroit schools were made the following day on December 1, leading many other area districts to cancel classes for at least one day; according to Sheriff Bouchard, at least 60 schools were affected by the closures. By December 3, at least 519 schools in 70 different districts in Michigan and six other states had closed their schools down in the wake of additional threats. Bouchard also vowed to investigate, and Oakland County Prosecutor McDonald said they will press criminal charges against anyone who threatens violence at schools in the county.

Schools around the country faced threats through social media on December 17, with some closing as a precaution. Others increased security and police presence on campuses, even after investigating the threats and finding that they lacked credibility, with some threats coming from other states. Multiple police stations and school districts issued statements about the threats and actions that would be taken against individuals who make them. An additional statement was issued by TikTok, where a large majority of threats were allegedly identified as being made; the company removed many of the threatening videos posted and was working with law enforcement.

Responses
President Joe Biden and U.S. Representative Elissa Slotkin, whose district includes Oxford High School, expressed their condolences over the shooting. Governor Gretchen Whitmer said in a statement that she was devastated for the students, staff, and families of the school, calling gun violence a "public health crisis". Whitmer also ordered all flags in Michigan to fly at half-staff. Democratic politicians in the Michigan Legislature vowed to pursue new gun control legislation and revive stalled bills relating to gun control.

Families of victims in the Sandy Hook Elementary School shooting expressed their solidarity with the families of the Oxford shooting. In addition, survivors and families of victims in the Stoneman Douglas High School shooting expressed outrage over the Oxford shooting and expressed their desire to continue fighting for change.

All four professional Detroit sports teams (Lions, Pistons, Tigers, and Red Wings) expressed their condolences to the community.

See also
 List of homicides in Michigan
 2023 Michigan State University shooting, which some students who were present at Oxford also survived

Notes

References

2021 active shooter incidents in the United States
2021 in Michigan
2021 mass shootings in the United States
2021 murders in the United States
2020s crimes in Michigan
21st-century mass murder in the United States
Deaths by firearm in Michigan
Filmed killings
High school killings in the United States
High school shootings in the United States
Mass murder in Michigan
Mass murder in the United States
Mass shootings in Michigan
Mass shootings in the United States
Massacres in 2021
November 2021 crimes in the United States
Oakland County, Michigan
School massacres in the United States
School shootings committed by pupils
Terrorist incidents in Michigan
Terrorist incidents in the United States in 2021